Acantholimon tataricum is a species of flowering plant in the Plumbaginaceae family. The native range of this species is in Xinjiang and the Western Himalayas and it was discovered by Boiss.

See also 
 List of Acantholimon species

References 

tataricum